Tafa is a Local Government Area in Niger State, Nigeria, adjoining the Federal Capital Territory. Its headquarters is in the town of Wuse.
  
It has an area of 222 km and a population of 83,544 at the 2006 census.

The postal code of the area is 910.

References

Local Government Areas in Niger State